32–34 High Street in Crieff, Perth and Kinross, Scotland, was designed by George Washington Browne. The building is Category A listed, dating to 1900. It was formerly a British Linen Bank and the Bank Restaurant.

As of 2016, the building was occupied by the Avanti Italian Restaurant, but it has since closed.

See also
List of listed buildings in Crieff, Perth and Kinross

References

1900 establishments in Scotland
Crieff High Street, 32-34